The first Bideford railway station was opened on 2 November 1855 as the terminus of the Bideford Extension Railway from Barnstaple. This was taken over by the London and South Western Railway about ten years later.

This station was resited in 1872 when the line was extended to Torrington.

Regular passenger trains from Barnstaple were withdrawn on Saturday 2 October 1965 although special trains occasionally used the station until the line was finally closed to freight in 1982. After closure a railway preservation society was formed to reopen the station and a short part of the line.  Over 220 yards of track were laid from the station and some rolling stock and a small diesel locomotive are on site. An occasional train service is operated from April to September and the replica signal box, interactive interpretation centre and cafe are also open during this period. The site is on the Tarka Trail so is accessible even if the centre is closed. See Bideford Railway Heritage Centre.

The remaining station buildings on the down side are owned by the adjacent Royal Hotel and are used for storage.

The station was included on the ATOC Connecting Communities report in 2009, which recommended closed lines and stations which should have a railway service. The report suggested the reopening of the Barnstaple - Bideford railway line.  In mid-2021 some members of the Bideford Railway Heritage Centre became actively involved in working towards this objective, with Railfuture, following the example of the government's Reopening Your Railway initiative. What became known as the ACE Rail campaign quickly became adopted by the Tarka Rail Association.

References

External links
 Bideford station on navigable 1946 O. S. map

Disused railway stations in Devon
Former London and South Western Railway stations
Railway stations in Great Britain opened in 1855
Railway stations in Great Britain closed in 1872
Railway stations in Great Britain opened in 1872
Railway stations in Great Britain closed in 1965
Beeching closures in England
Railway station
Torridge District